NGC 323 is an elliptical galaxy located in the constellation Phoenix. It was discovered on October 3, 1834, by John Herschel. It was described by Dreyer as "pretty faint, small, round, brighter middle, preceding (western) of 2", the other being NGC 328.

References

0323
18341003
Phoenix (constellation)
Elliptical galaxies
Discoveries by John Herschel
003374